The MWfly B25 is a family of Italian aircraft engines, designed and produced by MWfly of Passirana di Rho for use in light aircraft.

Design and development
The B25 series are all four-cylinder four-stroke, horizontally-opposed,  displacement, liquid-cooled, gasoline engine designs. They all employ dual electronic ignition systems and have a compression ratio of 10.5:1.

Variants
B25D
B25G
B25R
By March 2018 the engine was no longer advertised on the company website and seems to be out of production.

Specifications (B25R)

See also

References

External links

MWfly aircraft engines
Liquid-cooled aircraft piston engines
2010s aircraft piston engines